Durgo Rahasya (Lit: The Mystery of the Fortress) is an adventure detective novel written in 1952 by Sharadindu Bandyopadhyay.

Characters
Byomkesh Bakshi 
Ajit Bandyopadhyay
Satyabati 
Dr.Ashwini Ghatak 
Professor Ishan Chandra Majumder
Sadhu Rambinod Singh
Ramkishore Singh
Bangshidhar Singh
Manilal
Murlidhar Singh
Haripriya
Ramapati
Tulsi
Ganapat (servant) 
Sitaram
Ataullah
Bulaki Lal (coachman) 
Himanghu (lawyer)

Adaptations

Television
 This was one of the stories of 1993 TV series Byomkesh Bakshi titled "Kile Ka Rahasya"., that were recreated for broadcasting on Doordarshan, the Indian National Network, by Basu Chatterjee, and immediately went on to become one of the most memorable episodes.
 The story adapted into another TV series in 2014 named Byomkesh, which aired on Bengali channel ETV Bangla.

Film
 Sayantan Ghosal (director) announced that his next Byomkesh film will be based on this story.

References

20th-century Indian novels
Indian Bengali-language novels
Indian mystery novels
Detective fiction
Indian novels adapted into television shows
1952 novels
1952 Indian novels
Byomkesh Bakshi